Promenade was an experimental musical comedy with book and lyrics by María Irene Fornés and music by Rev. Al Carmines, originally produced off-Broadway by Edgar Lansbury and Joseph Beruh. In a review in The New York Times for a 1983 New York revival, Stephen Holden linked the production to the Theatre of the Absurd: "This work, which suggests a mixture of Candide and Samuel Beckett viewed through Lewis Carroll's looking glass, is a little too avant-garde and absurdist to appeal to mainstream tastes.  But in its odd way it's an exquisite piece of musical theater."

Original production

Promenade premiered on April 9, 1965 at the Judson Poets' Theatre, Judson Memorial Church, 55 Washington Square, NYC, where it played for three weekends.

It was then produced four years later in a commercial run Off-Broadway at the Promenade Theatre (for which it was named), produced by Edgar Lansbury and Joseph Beruh, opening on June 4, 1969. The cast was led by Madeline Kahn, playing the role of the Servant, also including Shannon Bolin, Ty McConnell, Gilbert Price, Alice Playten, Michael Davis, and Carrie Wilson. When Kahn left Promenade, claiming illness, she was replaced by Pamela Hall, who had just closed on Broadway as the ingenue in Jerry Herman's DEAR WORLD. Hall was understudied by Sandra Schaeffer, Later the role was played by Marie Santell. Pamela Hall went on to direct the revival of Promenade in 2010, which was produced by Original Cast member Edmund Gaynes. After a successful run, Promenade closed on January 18, 1970 after 259 performances. Subsequently, it was produced in Chicago under the direction of June Pyskacek by her theater, the Kingston Mines Theatre Co., where in 1971 the world premiere of "Grease" commenced its long run.

Promenade is listed in the Time Life Decade Books Series as an "anti-Vietnam War statement," perhaps because of the scene towards the end where rich people are dancing in a maypole around the two convicts who are now dressed in bandages as war victims.

Complete original cast:
	

Originally, Columbia was interested in recording the cast album as a two-record set, but after a disagreement between the record company and the cast over salaries, Columbia abandoned the project. RCA agreed to record the album, but only as a single LP. By the time the recording was finally made, Kahn was no longer available, playing in SHOW BOAT in San Diego. Pamela Hall was also out of town, so the role was sung on the album by Sandy Schaeffer. Cast members George S. Irving and Mark Allen III were on vacation, and so their musical numbers were not recorded. Because of the time limitations of a single disc, several production numbers, including "Spring Beauties" and "The Laughing Song," also were not recorded. The recording, such as it is, can be found on CD (RCA Victor 09026 63333 2).

Scenes and Musical Numbers

ACT 1

SCENE 1: THE CELL

Promenade Theme—Orchestra

Dig Dig Dig* -- 105 & 106

SCENE 2: THE BANQUET ROOM

Unrequited Love—Misses I, O, U, Messrs. R, S, T, Servant, Waiter, 105, 106

Isn't That Clear—Mr. S with Ensemble

Don't Eat It* -- Ensemble

Four (Naked Lady) -- Misses I, O, U, Messrs. R, S, T, Servant, Waiter, 105, 106, Dishwasher

Chicken Is He—Rosita

The Moment Has Passed—Miss O

A Flower—Miss I

Rosita Rodriguez* -- Mayor

Apres Vous* -- 105, 106, Jailor

Bliss* -- Servant, 105, 106, and Ensemble

SCENE 3: THE STREET

The Cigarette Song—Servant, 105, 106

Thank You* -- Dishwasher

The Clothes Make The Man—Servant, 105, 106

Two Little Angels—Mother, 105, 106

The Passing of Time—105, 106

Capricious and Fickle (You Cad) -- Miss U

Crown Me—Servant, 105, 106

ACT 2

SCENE 1: THE BATTLEFIELD

Mr. Sidney N. Phelps* -- Waiter

Madeline* -- Waiter

Spring Beauties* -- Ensemble

Apres Vous (reprise)* -- Ensemble

A Poor Man (When I Was Born) -- 105, 106

Why Not? (Promenade Theme)* -- Servant, 105, 106, Mother, Dishwasher, Waiter

SCENE 2: THE DRAWING ROOM

The Finger Song* -- Mr. R, Ensemble

Little Fool—Mr. T, Ensemble

Chardiz* -- Servant

The Laughing Song* -- Ensemble

A Mother's Love* -- Mother

SCENE 3: THE CELL

Listen, I Feel—Servant

I Saw A Man—Mother

All is Well in the City—105, 106, Ensemble

(*Not on the original cast recording)

2010 Concert
On Monday, April 12, 2010, a semi-staged concert of Promenade was performed Off-Broadway at New York City's New World Stages (Stage 2) as the first of a planned series called Legacy: the Musicals of Off-Broadway. It was produced by Edmund Gaynes and directed by Pamela Hall. Ken Lundie was music director.

2010 Concert Cast:

References

1965 musicals
Plays by María Irene Fornés
Hispanic and Latino American plays
Off-Broadway musicals